El Hayat TV also known as  is an Algerian Arabic language television channel that airs in countries in North Africa, West Asia, the Middle East and Europe.

History 
The channel was founded in Algiers on Ramadan 16 May 2018 by Hannachi Habet, the president of Epcom Plus publishing company.

References

External links

Television in Algeria
Television channels and stations established in 2018
Television stations in Algeria
2018 establishments in Algeria